The 1983 Segunda División de Chile was the 32nd season of the Segunda División de Chile.

Cobresal was the tournament's champion.

Table

Promotion and relegation playoffs

Promotion playoffs

Relegation playoffs

See also
Chilean football league system

References

External links
 RSSSF 1983

Segunda División de Chile (1952–1995) seasons
Primera B
1983 in South American football leagues